Kananga Airport  is an airport serving Kananga, Democratic Republic of the Congo.

Airlines and destinations

See also

Transport in the Democratic Republic of the Congo
List of airports in the Democratic Republic of the Congo

References

External links
OpenStreetMap - Kananga Airport
OurAirports - Kananga Airport

Kananga
Airports in Kasaï-Central